was a Japanese rower. He competed in the men's coxed pair event at the 1936 Summer Olympics. He was killed in action during World War II.

References

External links
 

1914 births
1945 deaths
Japanese male rowers
Olympic rowers of Japan
Rowers at the 1936 Summer Olympics
Place of birth missing
Japanese military personnel killed in World War II
Imperial Japanese Army personnel of World War II
Imperial Japanese Army officers